Wheatland County is a municipal district in south-central Alberta, Canada that is east of Calgary. Located in Census Division No. 5, its municipal office is located east of the Town of Strathmore on Highway 1.

History 
On January 1, 1955, Improvement District No. 41, part of Improvement District No. 42, part of the Municipal Districts of Bow Valley No. 40, Serviceberry No. 43, and Kneehill No. 48, were merged into one new municipal district to be known as the Municipal District of Wheatland No. 40 for the first time.

The Municipal District of Wheatland No. 40 and the Wheatland School Division No. 40 joined together on January 1, 1961, and became known as the County of Wheatland No. 16.

On March 6, 1996, the name was changed from the County of Wheatland No. 16 to the name currently used, Wheatland County.

Geography

Communities and localities 
The following urban municipalities are surrounded by Wheatland County.
Cities
none
Towns
Strathmore
Villages
Hussar
Rockyford
Standard
Summer villages
none

The following hamlets are located within Wheatland County.
Hamlets
Carseland
Chancellor
Cheadle
Cluny
Gleichen
Lyalta
Namaka
Nightingale
Rosebud

The following localities are located within Wheatland County.
Localities 
Ardenode (designated place)
Baintree
Bartstow
Caruso
Crowfoot
Dalum
Dunshalt
Eagle Lake
Gayford
Grierson
Grieseach
Hamlet
Hawick
Makepeace
Phidias
Redland (designated place)
Rosebud Creek
Stobart
Strangmuir
Towers
Tudor

The following Hutterite colonies are located within Wheatland County.
Hillview Colony
Hutterian Brethren Colony
Mountain View Colony
Rideland Colony
Rosebud Colony
Springvale Colony
Stahlville Colony
Standard Colony
Sunshine Colony
Twin Creek Colony
Wheatland Colony
Wintering Hills Colony

Demographics 
In the 2021 Census of Population conducted by Statistics Canada, Wheatland County had a population of 8,738 living in 2,842 of its 3,108 total private dwellings.

Attractions  
After the sod turning in 2016, the Strathmore Motor Products Sports Centre opened its doors to the public on February 23, 2019. The unique partnership between Golden Hills School Division #75, the Town of Strathmore, and Wheatland County made the project possible. The facility will serve as a regional recreational centre for visitors and residents of Strathmore and Wheatland County. The facility offers an indoor space to play soccer, lacrosse, basketball, volleyball, badminton, pickleball, and walking/running on the indoor track.

The Hamlet of Rosebud is home to the Rosebud Theatre and School of the Arts (Alberta's only professional rural theatre) and regular performances are held. Rosebud is also home to the annual Rosebud Chamber Music Festival, several art galleries, boutique shops and a centennial museum. 

Wheatland County has three golf courses. The Oxbow Country Golf Course is a 9-hole course, while Speargrass Golf Course and Muirfield Lakes Golf Club are 18-hole courses.

Education 
Wheatland County is part of the Golden Hills School Division.

There are two schools within Wheatland County boundaries: the Carseland School (elementary), and the Wheatland Crossing School (K-12).

Carseland School is one of the oldest schools in the region.  It was originally built in 1930 then rebuilt in 1993. It serves the hamlet of approximately 700 people as well as the surrounding rural area.

The Wheatland Crossing School is located in rural Wheatland County and serves students living in Rockyford, Rosebud, Standard, Cluny, Gleichen, Hussar, and east Wheatland. The official grand opening for Wheatland Crossing took place on September 26, 2017.

Located in Strathmore, Alberta, there are additional schools belonging to the Golden Hills School Division. There are three elementary schools (Wheatland, Westmount, and Brentwood), one junior high school (Crowther Memorial Junior High School), and one high school (Strathmore High School). In 2018, a new regional K-12 school (George Freeman) opened and will be serving Strathmore and rural Wheatland County students.

Christ the Redeemer Catholic School Division also provides education services to the region with a K-6 School (Sacred Heart Academy) and grade 7 to 12 school (Holy Cross Collegiate) in Strathmore.

In September 2008, Trinity Christian Academy opened at the former Covenant Bible College property in Strathmore. Trinity Christian is a Christian school providing Kindergarten through grade 9 and is publicly funded.

Economy 
The economy of Wheatland County is dominated by agriculture and the oil and gas industry. 

There are two industrial areas in the County. The Origin Business Park is a light/medium industrial area on Highway 1 near the Rocky View County border. The Goldfinch Industrial ASP area has a heavy industrial cluster. Goldfinch is located off of Highway 24 near the Hamlet of Carseland and is served by CP Rail. Companies such as Nutrien, Orica, Stella Jones, Federated Coop Ltd, and Richardson Pioneer have plants in the area. 

Wheatland County also has a developing renewable energy industry with several solar and wind projects and a gas to liquids upgrading facility. The county is actively pursuing opportunities in the hydrogen space and has hired a specialist to develop a strategy and engage industry. 

In July 2022, CGC Inc., announced plans to invest $210 Million to construct a wallboard plant in the Goldfinch area of the county. 

On September 21, 2022, De Havilland Canada announced that it would construct a new aircraft production facility called De Havilland Field in Wheatland County. This is an investment that will eventually create 1,500 jobs. 

The Infinite WC is the economic development brand for Wheatland County.

See also 
List of communities in Alberta
List of municipal districts in Alberta

References

External links 

Economic Development website https://infinitewc.ca/

 
Municipal districts in Alberta